Franktown Cave is located 25 miles south of Denver, Colorado on the north edge of the Palmer Divide. It is the largest rock shelter documented on the Palmer Divide, which contains artifacts from many prehistoric cultures. Prehistoric hunter-gatherers occupied Franktown Cave intermittently for 8000 years beginning about 6400 B.C. The site held remarkable lithic and ceramic artifacts, but it is better known for its perishable artifacts, including animal hides, wood, fiber and corn. Material goods were produced for their comfort, task-simplification and religious celebration. There is evidence of the site being a campsite or dwelling as recent as AD 1725.

Geography

Situated on Palmer Divide, which separates the South Platte River basin from the Arkansas River basin, Franktown Cave is its largest documented rock shelter in the area. Palmer Divide is an east–west ridge in central Colorado that runs perpendicular to the Rocky Mountains between Denver and Colorado Springs and east to Limon, Colorado.

The cave was created when water eroded the soft, water soluble layers of Dawson Arkose formation through seeps below a thick, hard shelf of Castle Rock Conglomerate. The area provides two key raw materials that were used for tool-making:
 Microcrystalline rock in white chalcedony, light yellow and caramel that was formed from petrified wood during the Paleocene period. Projectile points and small bifaces were made from microcrystalline rock.
 Wall Mountain tuff rhyolite from the Oligocene age for flake tools.

Near the rock shelter, spring-fed streams traverse a land of scrub oak, plains grassland and open ponderosa pine forest.

Physical Characteristics
Franktown Cave is the largest rockshelter documented in the Palmer Divide. This is where most of the excavations were placed and the majority of the artifacts were found. The shelter is naturally divided into a lower and upper shelter. The upper shelter is on the south side and the lower shelter is on the north side. Very little documented excavation has occurred in the upper shelter, because it has thin sediment cover over the bedrock and is periodically saturated with water. Very few artifacts have been found in the upper shelter.

History
Prehistoric cultural periods of eastern Colorado are traditionally identified as: Paleo-Indians at the earliest, Archaic, Ceramic and Protohistoric phases.  Evidence of Franktown Cave habitation began with the early Archaic period about 6,400 BC and continued through each of the remaining cultural periods to AD 1725.

Archaic periods
People of the Archaic period moved seasonally to gather wild plants and hunt game, such as deer, antelope and rabbits.   Late in the Archaic period, about AD 200–500, corn was introduced into the diet and pottery was made for storing and carrying food.

The early, middle and late Archaic periods are all represented at the Franktown cave. The early period was marked by a nomadic hunter-gatherer lifestyle in the mountains and foothills, adapted to smaller game and greater reliance on gathering wild plants for food than their Paleo-Indian ancestors. During this period new stone tools were created to process and prepare plants for meals. Gilmore submits that bison antiquus, the primary source of food for the Paleo-Indian, became extinct due to increasingly warm and arid climate changes of the Holocene Altithermal period [a warm period about 9,000 to 5,000 years ago]. To survive people adapted by hunting smaller game and gathering plants, seeds, and nuts.

As of 2005, Franktown Cave is the only well documented rockshelter site to have evidence of middle Archaic occupation on the Palmer Divide. Based upon archaeological evidence, it appears that mountain people had longer transitional periods through the Archaic and Ceramic periods than those on the Plains. Franktown Cave residents who were adapted to the mountain culture, were also slow in integrating bow and arrow technology and other advancements.

Ceramic periods
The Early Ceramic, or Woodland, period began in the Plains about AD 0, distinguished by the introduction of the cordwrapped pottery and the bow and arrow. People also began to live in small settlements.

At Franktown, Early Ceramic artifacts include a pottery fragments, a fragment of a coiled basket similar to the earlier periods, and a small corner-notched point - which seems to indicate that the uptake of new technology was slower here than at some other sites during the Early Ceramic period.

Artifacts from AD 780–1290, the middle Ceramic period, include small, distinctive side-notched projectile points, clothing, charcoal, potsherds, a sinew and twig net, and corn cobs. The sinew and twig net is similar to hoops used for several Native American nations' games. Franktown artifacts from the Archaic period reflect the influence of the southern Apishapa culture of the Arkansas basin and the Upper Republican plains people of the South Platte basin in northeastern Colorado and northwestern Kansas. The pottery has the conical shape of Plains Woodland pottery and the cord-markings and rims of Upper Republican pottery.

Population size and mobility changed during the Archaic periods. The number of early Ceramic period sites increased, reflecting an increase in population. By the middle Ceramic phase, there was a marked decrease in the number of sites. People stayed in one place for shorter periods of time and were part of smaller and more mobile groups.

Protohistory
The groups of people during this period became much more diverse, were more likely to settle in a location or a couple of locations, cultivate food, domesticate animals, make pottery and baskets, and perform ceremonial rituals.  Artifacts from 1540 to 1860, the latest prehistoric period, include corn cobs, arrow points and what appear to be Dismal River Gray ceramic fragments. It is believed that the people of the Dismal River culture were Apache Native Americans. While the Middle Ceramic period reflected a significant decrease in population, it appears as if there was an upswing in eastern Colorado population during the Protohistoric period.

Archaeology

Rock shelter description
The rock shelter, sheltered from extreme precipitation and temperature extremes, faced east. At the front edge of the cave, large rocks provided a protecting barrier. There is a lower level on the southern portion of the cave and another several yards higher on the northern side. The southern portion of the cave was dry which preserved most of the excavated items. The upper level had a water seep and few artifacts were found there.

Artifacts
More than 4000 artifacts were recovered from Franktown cave in the 1940s and 1950s. They can be divided into four categories. 2180 chipped stone artifacts were excavated. This includes projectile points and fragments. 234 groundstone artifacts were recovered, and 862 potsherds were recovered as well. Potsherds include cord marked and plain wares. 351 perishable artifacts were excavated. This includes fibers, animal hide, bones, and wood. 791 ecofacts were recovered as well. Ecofacts such as corn and other plant remains, as well as, animal remains, shells and wood. Perishable artifacts and ecofacts are almost completely unknown from sites in the Platte River Basin, and the quantity and variety of the artifacts found is unmatched in the northeastern part of the state.

Examination of the ceramic vessels show that they were made of patches of clay which were then bonded and strengthened using a paddle and anvil technique. This technique is common on Plains sites. It was also found that some of the materials the pottery was made from were local materials. The analysis of the pottery reflects that there was a more intensive occupation of Franktown Cave at the end of the Early Ceramic and the beginning of the Middle Ceramic.

Research into the woven materials indicates technical affinities with peoples to the South and Southwest during the early to middle Archaic transition. Such woven materials include sandals. It was found that different types of sandals were made for the winter and the summer. A more complex sandal with straps meant to hold grass socks were used in the cooler months, while a lighter sandal was used in the warmer months.

Hide used for the production of clothing were found in the faunal remains. There were a high number of bison bone and other large fauna. The presence of rodent bones, snares and rabbit hide robes suggests that small game was also important. Another perishable artifact found was a moccasin, which was worn from use. AMS dates on the moccasin suggest that it was discarded sometime between AD 980 and 1160. The lithic technology suggests extensive reliance on the locally available petrified wood, rhyolite, and quartzite. This pattern of heavy reliance on local raw materials holds to other sites in the Palmer Divide area.

Corn may have been significant to people living in Franktown Cave in different ways at different times. People first began using corn at Franktown Cave in the transition from the Early Ceramic to the Middle Ceramic era. During the Middle Ceramic the climate was wetter and milder, and the human population in the area was higher.

Excavations were conducted intermittently since the 1940s focused primarily on the southern, lower level of the cave. 4000 pre-historic items were found at the site, 2180 of which were chipped stone artifacts. The table below shows the artifacts found by cultural period and period of time, dated by Accelerator Mass Spectrometry (AMS) and Radiocarbon dating.

Franktown Cave is similar to Trinchera Cave Archeological District and Chamber Cave, all of which showed significant evidence of residence, including a wealth of perishable items. The Trinchera and Chamber Cave sites are located south of Franktown Cave in the Arkansas River basin and were influenced by the people of the southern Great Plains.

Artifact counts and description by category
The counts of artifacts by category are:

Excavation and studies

Franktown Cave has been excavated for the past fifty years. Hugh O. Capp, Jr. Was the first to excavate Franktown Cave in 1942. He worked on the north end of the cave. He left the University of Denver with the artifacts in paper sacks, along with his report and all his sketches and photographs. Unfortunately, his report has never been found. Arnold Withers was next to excavate the cave. Withers first excavated in 1949 then again in 1952. The only remaining notes associated with these excavations are a map by Gilbert Wenger, which shows the locations of each “Stratitest” and the test pits, and a stratigraphic profile drawn by David Breternitz. Withers never wrote a report of his finds at Franktown Cave.

Gerold “Tommy” Thompson was the next to excavate Franktown Cave in 1956 and 1957. He recorded a great deal about his excavation. Thompson recovered a sandal and cordage during his excavations. He analyzed the sandal and determined that there were at least two types of sandals. Winter sandals which had more complex straps and a grass sock, and a summer sandal with simpler straps and no grass sock. Charles W. Manz, analyzed 500 pieces of lithic debitage, waste flakes from the manufacture of stone tools in the Franktown Cave collection in 1973. He found that 40% of the debitage showed evidence of breakage after deposition and bag wear. This suggests breakage after collection due to rough or improper handling. His study indicated that people at Franktown Cave mainly used expedient tools from the locally available raw materials.

Sarah M. Nelson and Sarah Studenmund collaborated on a paper and found that the pottery from Franktown cave can all be considered a single type. They found no statistical difference between the cord-marked and smooth pottery, except for the presence or absence of the marks.

The site has also been subject to excavations before the 1940s by local Boy Scouts and has been subject to looting over time.

Historical significance
Franktown Cave was added to the National Register of Historic Places in 2006.

See also
National Register of Historic Places listings in Douglas County, Colorado
 Cedar Point Village - archaeological site in southwestern Colorado also having Dismal River culture artifacts
 Cherry Creek Rockshelter
 List of prehistoric sites in Colorado

Notes

References

Bibliography
 Cassells, E. Steve. (1997) [1983] The Archaeology of Colorado. Boulder: Johnson Press. .
 Gibbon, Guy E.; Ames, Kenneth M. Archaeology of Prehistoric Native America: An Encyclopedia.  1998. .
 Gilmore, Kevin P. National Register Nomination Form: Franktown Cave. Site 5DA272. University of Denver. p. 8-9. Retrieved 9-27-2011.
 Griffin-Pierce, Trudy. (2010). The Columbia Guide to American Indians of the Southwest. New York:Columbia University Press. .
 Gunnerson, James H. (1987). Archaeology of the High Plains. Denver: United States Forest Service.
 King, Anthony (2006). Substance Dynamics and Stone Tools at Franktown Cave, Colorado. Unpublished Thesis. Note: An unpublished Thesis is not generally considered a reliable source.
 Kipfer, Barbara Ann. (2000). Encyclopedic Dictionary of Archaeology. New York:Plenum Publisher. .
 Nelson, Sarah M. (2008).  Denver: An Archaeological History. Boulder, CO: University Press of Colorado. p. 74. .
 Waldman, Carl. (2009) [1985].  Atlas of the North American. New York:Facts on File.  .

Archaeological sites on the National Register of Historic Places in Colorado
Archaeological sites in Colorado
Paleo-Indian archaeological sites in Colorado
Plains Village period
Plains Woodland period
Protected areas of Douglas County, Colorado
Rock shelters in the United States
National Register of Historic Places in Douglas County, Colorado